Mont Mouchet is a  mountain located on the border of the French départements  of Cantal, Haute-Loire and Lozère. It is famous for the historical events which took place there, notably during the Second World War where it hosted a group of French resistance fighters, the Maquis du Mont Mouchet. At the summit there is a large cairn and view-point (about 3 metres high) from which there is a splendid panoramic view over much of Central France from the Massif Central to the Alps.

The beast of Gévaudan

On the 19 June 1767, Jean Chastel, accompanied only by his two sons, left to track down the Beast of Gévaudan in the forest of Mont Mouchet. According to Chastel's description, the beast would emerge from the woods onto the track, and sit on its haunches in fright, awaiting an inescapable death.

The beast and the World War II resistance

Historians and other researchers on the beast of Gévaudan have often been taken by the parallel between the story of the beast and that of the French resistance. The fact that 3,000 Nazi soldiers in the search for dissidents were not able to find 2,700 maquis fighters surrounding the Mont Mouchet forest where two centuries earlier, three men had tracked down the beast, tends to support the conspiracy theory that Chastel himself was involved in the massacres, attributed to the beast, which took place in Gévaudan at this time.

Tourist locations 
 Near to the summit of Mont Mouchet in the commune of Auvers, is a memorial to the resistance alongside a museum of the Haut Gévaudan maquisards.

Quotes
 General Charles de Gaulle, 5 June 1955

External links 

  History

Mountains of Auvergne-Rhône-Alpes
Mountains of Lozère